Kemburi Ramamohan Rao M.A. is an Indian parliament member.

Rao was elected to the 9th Lok Sabha from Bobbili constituency in 1989 as a member of Telugu Desam Party.

Rao was born at Purli of Srikakulam district, Andhra Pradesh on 12 October 1949. He has studied at Andhra University, Visakhapatnam.

Rao has married Rushi in 1974 and had two daughters.

Rao was also member of Andhra Pradesh Legislative Assembly. He was elected from Cheepurupalli constituency in 1985 and held the office till 1989.
He dedicated his life to helping of poor.

References

External links
 Biodata of Kemburi Ramamohan Rao at Lok Sabha website.

India MPs 1989–1991
Telugu Desam Party politicians
1949 births
Living people
Lok Sabha members from Andhra Pradesh
Telugu politicians
People from Srikakulam district
Members of the Andhra Pradesh Legislative Assembly